Robert Mark Elvins (born 17 September 1986) is a professional footballer who played most recently for Leamington as a midfielder.

Career

West Bromwich Albion
Elvins was born in Alvechurch, Worcestershire and progressed through the youth system at West Bromwich Albion. He played a number of times for the reserve team and won the club's Young Player of the Year award for the 2004–05 season. He failed to make a single appearance for the first team, however; he was an unused substitute in a third round FA Cup replay at Reading in January 2006. Elvins was loaned out to League One team Cheltenham Town for a month on 8 September 2006. On 31 January 2007, Elvins joined Conference National team York City on a month's loan. His loan at York was extended for a second month on 6 March 2007.

Aldershot Town
Elvins was signed by Aldershot Town on 27 June 2007 after being released by West Brom at the end of the 2006–07 season. He made his debut in a 2–1 victory over Kidderminster Harriers and played in 40 games and scored seven goals for the side as they won the Conference Premier in the 2007–08 season. He was loaned out to Woking for the remainder of the 2008–09 season on 10 February 2009. He made his debut in a 1–0 defeat to Kettering Town on 14 February. He scored the equalising goal for Woking in a 1–1 draw against Wrexham on 14 March. He returned to Aldershot from his loan spell early on 7 April. Aldershot manager Gary Waddock confirmed Elvins would be released by Aldershot at the end of the season.

Worcester City
Following his release by Aldershot, Elvins had trials with Rushden & Diamonds and Kidderminster Harriers, and received offers from two other clubs before deciding to sign for Conference South team Worcester City on 24 July.

On 16 May 2013, Elvins and teammate Mathew Birley left Worcester for Conference North club Solihull Moors.

Honours
Aldershot Town
Conference Premier: 2007–08

Career statistics

References

External links

1986 births
Living people
People from Alvechurch
English footballers
Association football forwards
West Bromwich Albion F.C. players
Cheltenham Town F.C. players
York City F.C. players
Aldershot Town F.C. players
Woking F.C. players
Worcester City F.C. players
Solihull Moors F.C. players
Halesowen Town F.C. players
English Football League players
National League (English football) players
Sportspeople from Worcestershire